The Hamersley Range is a mountainous region of the Pilbara region of Western Australia.  The range was named on 12 June 1861 by explorer Francis Thomas Gregory after Edward Hamersley, a prominent promoter of his exploration expedition to the northwest. Karijini National Park (formerly known as Hamersley Range National Park) lies within the range.

History

The traditional Aboriginal owners of the area that the range runs through are the Puutu Kunti Kurrama and Pinikura peoples.

In 1999 a small range within the Hamersley was named the Hancock Range after the Hancock family, who were pioneers in the area. The Hancock range is east of Karijini National Park in a region of broad valleys and peaks that rise to almost . The Hancock Range is close to Mulga Downs Station, a property owned by the Hancock family and where Lang Hancock is buried.

Geography

The range runs from the Fortescue River in the northeast,  to the south. The range contains Western Australia's highest point, Mount Meharry, which reaches approximately  AHD. There are many extensively eroded gorges, such as Wittenoom Gorge. The twenty highest peaks in Western Australia are in the Hamersley Range. Peaks in the range include Mount Bruce, Mount Nameless/Jarndunmunha, Mount Reeder Nichols, Mount Samson, Mount Truchanas and Mount Tom Price.

Karijini National Park (formerly Hamersley National Park), one of Australia's largest national parks, is centred in the range.

Mining

The range contains large deposits of iron ore, producing a large proportion of Australia's iron ore exports. It is predominately associated with banded iron formation.
Western Australia's major iron producers have mines, communities and railways that occur along the range. Rio Tinto operates several iron ore mines within the range, including Mount Tom Price, Marandoo, Brockman, Channar, West Angelas, Mesa A mine, and Paraburdoo. Over 100 million tonnes of iron ore is removed from the range every year.

Existence of crocidolite (blue asbestos) in the Hamersley Range has been known since 1915. In 1917 crocidolite was discovered at Wittenoom, it was mined from the 1930s and was discontinued in 1966 because of unprofitable production costs. Wittenoom, was Australia's only blue asbestos mining town.

Juukan Gorge

The cave was destroyed by Rio Tinto along with another Aboriginal sacred site on 23 May 2020 as part of their expansion of the Brockman 4 mine.

See also
 Karijini National Park
 Ophthalmia Range

References

Further reading 
 Marshall, Lloyd (1966) New Iron Age in the Hamersleys in the Weekend News, Sept. 3, 1966.